René Antonio Alvarado Sánchez (born 15 February 1989) is a Nicaraguan professional boxer who held the WBA (Regular) super featherweight title from 2019 to January 2021. As of May 2020, he is ranked as the world's eighth best active super featherweight by BoxRec.

Personal life
Outside of boxing, Alvarado enjoys playing soccer, spending time with his family, and watching movies.

Professional career

Growing up, Alvarado was always a fan of boxing, specifically Oscar De La Hoya. Alvarado said that meeting De La Hoya and signing with Golden Boy Promotions was always a dream of his.

Alvarado turned professional on 2 May 2008, scoring a second-round knockout victory over Cristobal Ramos at the Casino Pharaohs in Managua, Nicaragua. He compiled a record of 31–8 (20 KO) before facing and defeating Andrew Cancio in a rematch to win the WBA (Regular) super featherweight title.

Alvarado suffered a loss to Yuriorkis Gamboa. After that loss, Alvarado said that he learned a lot and that he should trust his skills 

Leading into his fight with Roger Gutierrez on January 2, Alvarado and his camp took all the proper precautions to avoid a positive COVID-19 test so the fight can go on for his first World Title defense.

Professional boxing record

Personal life
René has a twin brother, Felix Alvarado, who is the current IBF light flyweight champion.

See also
List of world super-featherweight boxing champions

References

External links

1989 births
Living people
Sportspeople from Managua
Nicaraguan male boxers
Featherweight boxers
Super-featherweight boxers
World super-featherweight boxing champions
World Boxing Association champions
Twin sportspeople
Nicaraguan twins